Lola Forner (born 6 June 1960 in Alicante, Spain) also known as María Dolores Forner Toro, is a Spanish actress. She was crowned Miss Spain in 1979 and competed in Miss World 1979 and Miss Europe 1980. She is also known for starring alongside Jackie Chan in the movies Wheels on Meals and Armour of God.

Filmography

 The Family, Fine, Thanks (1979) - María
 Cuatro locos buscan manicomio (1980) - Teenager (uncredited)
 El Lobo negro (1981) - Isabel
 Dos y dos, cinco (1981) - Tina
 Duelo a muerte (1981) - Isabel
 Los Desastres de la guerra (1983, TV Series)
 Project A (1983) - British Admiral's daughter
 Shouts of Anxiety (1984) - Pilar
 Wheels on Meals (1984) - Sylvia
 El Último penalty (1984) - Lena
 Armour of God (1986) - May
 White Apache (1987) - Rising Sun
 Scalps (1987) - Connor's mistress
 Mikola a Mikolko (1988) - Zora
 Leyenda del cura de Bargota, La (1990, TV Movie) - Doña Beatriz
 La forja de un rebelde (1990, TV Series) - Carmen ierraguirre
 Pareja enloquecida busca madre de alquiler (1990) - Lola
 Non, ou A Vã Glória de Mandar (1990) - Princess Doña Isabel
 Ricos y famosos (1990, TV Series) - Hostess
 Amor de papel (1993, TV Series) - Rebeca de Cordova
 Curro Jiménez:el regreso de una leyenda (1995,TV series) - Clara
 Tu pasado me condena (1996, TV Movie)
 Calle Nueva (1998, TV Series) - Alex 
 La familia... 30 años después (1999, TV Movie) - María Alonso
 Paraíso (2000, TV Series) - Sonia
 El Secreto (2001, TV Series) - Elena Vega Montalbán
 Lisístrata (2002) - Colonia
 En nombre del amor (2008) - Carmén

References

External links
 

Spanish television actresses
Spanish film actresses
1960 births
Living people
Miss Spain winners
Miss World 1979 delegates
20th-century Spanish actresses
21st-century Spanish actresses
Actresses from the Valencian Community